The Minghu Dam (renamed the Takuan Dam, is a concrete gravity dam on the Shuili River located  north of Shuili Township in Nantou County, Taiwan. The reservoir formed by the dam serves as the lower reservoir for the Minhu Pumped Storage Hydro Power Station. Sun Moon Lake serves as the upper reservoir.

The dam and the power plant was constructed in 1980 and opened on 1 August 1985. Upon completion, it became Taiwan's first pumped-storage hydroelectricity power plant.

Takuan Power Plant
The pumped-storage hydroelectricity power plant, officially named Takuan Power Plant, which sits near the left abutment of the dam and moves water between the two reservoirs to generate electricity. During periods of low demand, such as at night, when electricity is cheap, water is pumped to Sun Moon Lake. When energy demand is high, water is released down to the power station for power generation. This is accomplished by four  Francis pump-turbine-generators which are reversible and serve to both pump water and generate electricity.

See also 

 List of dams and reservoirs in Taiwan
 List of power stations in Taiwan
 List of pumped-storage hydroelectric power stations
 Electricity sector in Taiwan

References

1985 establishments in Taiwan
Dams completed in 1985
Dams in Nantou County
Gravity dams